is a 2013 release Japanese drama movie starring Marin, Mitsuru Hirata Kensuke Owada and Taro Suruga. Written by Robin Nishi from the manga and directed by Hiroshi Nishio. The film was chosen for the Raindance Film Festival, and won its director, Hiroshi Nishio, the best new director award at the Osaka Film Festival in 2013.

Plot 
Amamoto (Mitsuru Hirata) is a recently retired Town Hall bureaucrat, who has not seen his daughter in many years. Following his retirement, he decides to go to Osaka to see her. Equipped only with a photo of her as a child, he meets random interesting people and encounters as part of his efforts. The film examines the strength of bonds in family, even in strained circumstance, as well as the bonds that can form with strangers.

Cast 
 Marin,
 Mitsuru Hirata
 Kensuke Owada
 Taro Suruga

References

External links 
 

2013 films
2010s Japanese-language films
Kadokawa Dwango franchises
Manga adapted into films
Enterbrain manga
2008 manga
Seinen manga
Japanese drama films
2010s Japanese films